The  is an archaeological site containing the ruins of a final Kofun period to early Nara period necropolis in the Kashiya neighborhood of the town of Kannami, Shizuoka in the Tōkai region of Japan.

Overview
The tombs are located on a steep hill and are dug into the tuff layer in four to five layers. Some of the upper level tombs are heavily weathered, and some of the lowest level tombs are buried. The tombs have rectangular, sometimes square, openings with vaulted ceilings averaging 1.5 meters heigh, and are between two and three meters deep. The passages are filled with river stones.  

The site consisted of between 300 and 500 tombs in a 600 by 250 meter area at an elevation of 20 to 30 meters, and are orientated south, east or west, facing the Tagata Plains, Mount Fuji, or Mount Hakone. Per a study by the Nippon University in 1947, the tombs can be divided into five distinct groups based on location and design, which were labelled "A" through "E".

The site has been known since at least the Meiji period; however, most of groups "A", "D" and "E" have been destroyed by property development and modern housing. The preserved area consists of groups "B" and C" with approximately 116 tombs. As a result of the Kannami Town Board of Education survey in 1997, and additional 17 unopened tombs were discovered, leading to the possibility that more may exist both within and without the protected area.

Grave goods recovered from the tombs include shards of Haji ware and Sue ware earthenware, gold, copper and stone jewelry (including magatama and cylindrical beads), weapons and horse fittings. One of the finds was a tortoise plastron used as an oracle bone for divination purposes. The graves are thought to have been created from the end of the 6th century to the end of the 8th century, and cremated human bones have also been found in the more recent graves, indicating a period of transition between burial and cremation.

Gallery

See also
List of Historic Sites of Japan (Shizuoka)

References

External links

Kannami Town official site 
Kannami Heritage Site 
Izu Geopark site

Kofun period
History of Shizuoka Prefecture
Kannami, Shizuoka
Archaeological sites in Japan
Historic Sites of Japan